Ludovic Orban (born 25 May 1963) is a Romanian engineer and politician who served as the Prime Minister of Romania from November 2019 to December 2020. He was president of the National Liberal Party (PNL) between 2017 and 2021, which expelled him shortly after he lost a bid for another term as its leader. He also served as Minister of Transport from April 2007 to December 2008 in the Tăriceanu II Cabinet.

From 2008 to 2016, he was a member of the Chamber of Deputies for Bucharest. He resumed his parliamentary seat within the Chamber of Deputies after the 2020 Romanian legislative election; shortly thereafter, he was elected President of the Chamber of Deputies of Romania. He resigned from this position in October 2021. Two months later, he founded a new centre-right political party, the Force of the Right (FD).

Biography

Early life and career
Orban was born in the Transylvanian city of Brașov to an ethnic Hungarian father and an ethnic Romanian mother. He was baptized and confirmed into his father’s Unitarian Church of Transylvania, and speaks Hungarian at a basic level. Between 1948 and 1956, under the early communist regime, the elder Orban was an agent of the Securitate secret police. Orban completed secondary studies at the city's Andrei Șaguna High School in 1982. He then studied industrial machinery design technology at the University of Brașov, graduating in 1988. In 1993, he completed post-graduate studies in Political Science at the National School of Administration and Political Science of Bucharest.

From 1988 to 1990, a period that spanned the Romanian Revolution, he trained as an engineer at an insulation factory in Târgu Secuiesc. He worked as an engineer at a Brașov factory from 1990 to 1991. From 1991 to 1992, he wrote for the daily Viitorul Românesc, and between 1997 and 2001, he held a series of government and agency positions as follows: at the Energy Policy Agency, the Disabled Persons Directorate, the Public Information Department, the National Public Employee Agency and the National Centre for Communications and Public Relations Specialisation. He has also been active in a foundation called Children, the light of the world and done consulting work.

Rise in politics
Orban served as a Sector 3 local councillor from 1992 to 1996. He was elected a Sector 1 local councillor that year, but resigned. From 1992 to 1997, Orban was an advisor for the Liberal Party 1993 (PL '93) (belonging to the party's executive committee between 1993 and 1997) and its predecessor PNL-AT, two splinter groups of the main National Liberal Party (PNL) which sided with the Romanian Democratic Convention during the mid to late 1990s. In 1998, he joined the PNL's national council, after the PL '93 merged into it. From 2001 to 2002 he sat on the PNL's permanent central bureau, and in 2002 joined the party's public administration committee. He headed the Bucharest chapter of the PNL from November 2002, and from July 2004 to April 2007 was Deputy Mayor of Bucharest.

He left this office following a cabinet reshuffle, becoming Transport Minister and serving until his party's loss at the 2008 election, where he himself won a seat in a Bucharest constituency. While minister, he also ran for Mayor of Bucharest as part of the 2008 local elections, losing in the first round by finishing in fourth place with 11.4% of the vote. In March 2009, concurrent with his ally Crin Antonescu's ascent to the PNL presidency and the sidelining of the Tăriceanu faction, Orban became the party's vice president. He ran for the party presidency in December 2014, and was defeated by Alina Gorghiu on a 47–28 vote. Orban was a candidate in the June 2016 race for mayor of Bucharest, but two months before the election, withdrew from the race as well as from his PNL and Chamber posts after being placed under investigation by the National Anticorruption Directorate. He was not a candidate in the 2016 parliamentary election. In January 2017, the High Court of Cassation and Justice acquitted Orban on a charge of influence peddling. The following month, he announced his candidacy for the PNL leadership; he went on to defeat Cristian Bușoi by a 78–21 margin.

Prime Minister and split from PNL 

In October 2019, after the fall of Viorica Dăncilă's government, President Klaus Iohannis designated Orban as Prime Minister. His cabinet received parliamentary approval the following month, with 240 lawmakers voting in favor, seven more than required. His government was ousted via a no-confidence motion in February 2020, with 261 lawmakers voting in favor. The following month, a new Orban-led cabinet received parliamentary approval on a 286–23 vote. Most PNL representatives, including Orban himself, were absent due to suspected exposure to COVID-19. The Social Democrats (PSD) voted in favor of the cabinet, given the emergency circumstances, while pledging concerted opposition. PRO Romania voted against. Orban resigned in December, following the PNL's poor performance at the parliamentary election. At the same time, Orban himself won a new term in the Chamber. Once the new parliament convened, he was elected its president, defeating his PSD rival by a vote of 179–110.

In 2021, Orban ran for a new term as PNL president. During the campaign, he staked out a liberal conservative position, emphasizing a commitment to traditional values and rejecting what he termed "Neo-Marxist progressivism". In September, during a party congress, Orban was defeated by Florin Cîțu on a 2,878–1,898 vote, or around 60%-40%. Shortly thereafter, Orban submitted his resignation as Chamber president to Cîțu. The latter not having taken any action by mid-October, Orban quit by notifying the Chamber secretariat himself. In November, the PNL leadership expelled Orban from the party. The following month, he founded a new centre-right party, Force of the Right (FD).

Controversies
Orban is a somewhat controversial figure, known for his provocative declarations. A fierce critic of former President Traian Băsescu, he called him an "imbecile" for referring to the "imbecile" attitude of a minister during summer 2008 floods, and once shouted, "The President is the last Sauron to rule in this realm of darkness!", in a clear reference to The Lord of the Rings of J.R.R. Tolkien.

He also criticised the Emil Boc government, which during 2009 was composed of the Băsescu-associated Democratic Liberal Party and the Social Democrats, referring to the latter party's then-leader Mircea Geoană as Băsescu's "steward"; and attacking cabinet policies on education, tourism promotion (which he sees as an unnecessary luxury), and the financial crisis (where he foresaw the government being unable to pay pensions and salaries). Speaking to a group of female PNL members in Alba County in March 2006, he drew accusations of sexism for stating, "You need not go through any boss's bed to reach important public positions", declaring that Mioara Mantale,  Elena Udrea and party colleague Raluca Turcan had done so, but not Mona Muscă or Norica Nicolai. Driving in Cotroceni in December 2007, his car hit a 16-year-old girl, forcing her hospitalisation; despite a call by prime minister Călin Popescu-Tăriceanu for his resignation, Orban refused to do so and prosecutors ultimately decided not to pursue criminal charges, although his license was suspended and he was fined.

Personal life

Orban and his wife Mihaela have one son. His brother, Leonard Orban, is the former European Commissioner for Multilingualism.

Electoral history

Mayor of Bucharest

See also 
 First Orban Cabinet
 Second Orban Cabinet

References

External links
 Official site
 Profile at the Romanian Chamber of Deputies site

|-

|-

1963 births
Chairpersons of the National Liberal Party (Romania)
Councillors in Romania
Living people
Members of the Chamber of Deputies (Romania)
Presidents of the Chamber of Deputies (Romania)
National Liberal Party (Romania) politicians
Romanian Ministers of Transport
Prime Ministers of Romania
Romanian engineers
People from Brașov
Romanian politicians of Hungarian descent
Andrei Șaguna National College (Brașov) alumni
Transilvania University of Brașov alumni
National University of Political Studies and Public Administration alumni
20th-century Unitarians
21st-century Unitarians